Herrmann Julius Meyer (April 4, 1826 – March 12, 1909) was a German publisher born in Gotha. He was the son of publisher Joseph Meyer (1796-1856).

After his father's death in 1856, Herrmann Meyer took charge of Bibliographisches Institut, a publishing firm in Hildburghausen. In 1874 he moved the headquarters to Leipzig, and in 1884 handed over the business to his sons, Arndt (1859-1920) and Hans (1858-1929), the latter renowned for his ascent of Mount Kilimanjaro.

In 1888 he established Stiftung zur Erbauung billiger Wohnungen, an association for the construction of inexpensive housing for working-class people in Leipzig. In 1900 the project had achieved foundation status, and by 1914 there were four "residential colonies" with a total of around 2700 homes in the districts of Lindenau, Eutritzsch, Reudnitz and Kleinzschocher.

References 
 This article is based on a translation of an article from the German Wikipedia.

1826 births
1909 deaths
19th-century German people
19th-century publishers (people)
German publishers (people)
People from Gotha (town)